Anatoliy Buznyk (born 21 May 1961) is a Ukrainian professional football manager and former player, who is the current manager and sports director of Ukrainian Second League club Livyi Bereh Kyiv.

Managing career

Ukraine national student football team
In 2001, under his management the Ukraine national student football team won the silver medals at the 2001 Summer Universiade in Beijing.

Zirka Kirovohrad
In April 2014 Buznyk was appointed for the second time as manager of Zirka Kirovohrad that was playing in the Ukrainian First League.

References

External links
 
 

1961 births
Living people
Soviet footballers
Ukrainian footballers
Ukrainian football managers
MFC Mykolaiv players
FC Dnipro Cherkasy players
SKA Kiev players
FC Artania Ochakiv players
Ukrainian First League players
FC Artania Ochakiv managers
FC Oleksandriya managers
FC Borysfen Boryspil managers
FC Zirka Kropyvnytskyi managers
FC Metalurh Zaporizhzhia managers
FC Livyi Bereh Kyiv managers
Ukrainian Premier League managers
Ukrainian Second League managers
Sportspeople from Mykolaiv
Ukraine student football team managers
Association football defenders